Bruce Lambourne Fowler (born July 10, 1947) is an American trombonist and composer. He played trombone on many Frank Zappa records, as well as with Captain Beefheart and in the Fowler Brothers Band. He composes and arranges music for movies, and has been the composer, orchestrator, or conductor for many popular films.

He is the son of jazz educator William L. Fowler and the brother of multi-instrumentalist Walt Fowler and bassist Tom Fowler. Bruce Fowler is participating in the Band from Utopia, the Mar Vista Philharmonic, and Jon Larsen's Strange News from Mars, featuring Zappa alumni Tommy Mars and Arthur Barrow. He also recorded albums with Air Pocket, a band including his siblings.

Fowler is the recipient of the 2007 Film & TV Music Awards for Best Score Conductor and Best Orchestrator.

Discography

With Frank Zappa/The Mothers of Invention
Over-Nite Sensation – 1973
Apostrophe (') – 1974
Roxy & Elsewhere – 1974
Bongo Fury – 1975 (Captain Beefheart appears on this album as well)
Zoot Allures – 1976
Studio Tan – 1978
Sleep Dirt – 1979
Orchestral Favorites – 1979
You Can't Do That on Stage Anymore, Vol. 1 – 1988
Broadway the Hard Way – 1989
The Best Band You Never Heard in Your Life – 1991
You Can't Do That on Stage Anymore, Vol. 4 – 1991
Make a Jazz Noise Here – 1991
Beat the Boots – 1992
Unmitigated Audacity (rec. 1974)
Piquantique (rec. 1973)
You Can't Do That on Stage Anymore, Vol. 6 – 1992
 Strictly Commercial – 1995
The Lost Episodes – 1996
Läther – 1996
Have I Offended Someone? – 1997
Cheap Thrills – 1998
Son of Cheap Thrills – 1999
Imaginary Diseases – 2006
Trance-Fusion – 2006
Wazoo – 2007
One Shot Deal – 2008
Road Tapes, Venue #2 – 2013
Roxy By Proxy – 2014
Roxy the Soundtrack – 2015
The Crux Of The Biscuit –
The Roxy Performances – 2018
Halloween 73 – 2019
Zappa - Original Motion Picture Soundtrack – 2020
Zappa '88: The Last US Show – 2021

With Air Pocket/The Fowler Brothers 
 1976: Fly On (East Wind)
1985: Hunter
1988: Breakfast for Dinosaurs

With Captain Beefheart 
Shiny Beast (Bat Chain Puller) – 1978
Doc at the Radar Station – 1980
I'm Going to Do What I Wanna Do: Live at My Father's Place 1978 – 2000

With The Toshiko Akiyoshi - Lew Tabackin Big Band
Farewell – 1980
From Toshiko With Love also released as Tanuki's Night Out – 1981
European Memoirs – 1982

Solo works
Synthetic Division(with Phil Teele) – 1984
Ants Can Count – 1990
Entropy – 1993
The Good Shepherd Soundtrack (with Marcelo Zarvos – 2006
Inception – 2010

With Oingo Boingo
Boingo Alive – 1988
Dark at the End of the Tunnel – 1990

With Randy Newman
Bad Love – 1999
Harps & Angels – 2008

With other artists
Stan Ridgway,The Big Heat – 1986
Ed Mann, Perfect World – 1990
J.J. Cale and Eric Clapton, The Road to Escondido – 2006
Avenged Sevenhold,Avenged Sevenfold – 2007
Jon Larsen,Strange News From Mars – 2007
Stu Nevitt,The Marion Kind – 2007

References

External links

Jazz fusion musicians
American jazz trombonists
Male trombonists
American jazz composers
American male conductors (music)
University of North Texas alumni
1947 births
Living people
The Mothers of Invention members
The Magic Band members
The Plugz members
21st-century American conductors (music)
21st-century trombonists
American male jazz composers
Air Pocket (band) members